Nel van der Voort (born 11 October 1951) is a Dutch gymnast. She competed at the 1972 Summer Olympics.

References

External links
 

1951 births
Living people
Dutch female artistic gymnasts
Olympic gymnasts of the Netherlands
Gymnasts at the 1972 Summer Olympics
Gymnasts from Amsterdam